Reno Rumble was an Australian renovation reality television series, it aired on the Nine Network. The series was hosted by Scott Cam and Shelley Craft, and judged by Colin McAllister and Justin Ryan. The series first aired on Tuesday 5 May 2015. On 28 October 2015, the series was renewed for a second season and aired on Monday 21 March 2016.

Contestants renovated two suburban houses, with one team eliminated each week. In season 1, the winner received a $100,000 cheque with half going to the winning couple’s favourite charity and a new Mazda CX-5 and the runner up received $50,000 with half going to charity. Throughout the length of the competition, the contestants will stay in luxury style caravans provided by Elite Caravans.

Each home will be judged by interior design experts who have been briefed by the home owners on the style they want for their renovation. In season two, the winning couple will again receive $100,000 but half will not go to charity.

Each week, each home will be blind judged (unaware of which team renovated which one – or the rooms assigned to each individual couple) and the team with the lowest score that week will be eliminated from the competition.

The series was cancelled due to unexpected low ratings during the second season.

Format

Season 1
Each week each individual team within the red & blue teams are allocated two rooms to deliver, first room is delivered within the first 48 hours, the highest scored individual team will receive immunity from elimination. The teams will then work on their second room the rest of the week, the team with the highest score are safe from elimination, the individual team with the lowest score in the losing team are eliminated.

Every room receives a gift from the homeowners, they must work to the brief/style of this object to be scored highly. Each team are allocated a budget, they must work within this budget.

Season 2
Each week, both teams are given $200,000 to renovate their houses with each individual team within the red & blue teams allocated two rooms to deliver at the end of each week. The homeowners give each individual team a brief for their rooms. The whole team (red or blue) with the highest score are the weeks winning team and avoid elimination, the lowest scoring individual team in the losing team will be eliminated.

Hosts and judges

Series changes
In the first season of Reno Rumble, it pit former contestants from Nine Network series The Block against former contestants from Seven Network series House Rules. Scott Cam hosted the season and was judged by Darren Palmer & Romy Alwill. The winner received $100,000 (half to charity of choice) and a Mazda CX-5.

In the second season, it pit state based rookie teams from the East and West sides of Australia competing against each other. Judges Darren Palmer & Romy Alwill were replaced by Scottish interior decorators Colin McAllister and Justin Ryan and Shelley Craft joined as co-host alongside Scott Cam. Similar to season 1, the winner received $100,000 but half did not go to a charity.

Series overview
 Colour key:
 – Winner
 – Runner-up

Season synopses

Season 1

Season one had former contestants from The Block on the Nine Network against former contestants from House Rules on the Seven Network. It first aired on Tuesday May 5, 2015 and ended on 22 June 2015. The season was won by Ayden & Jess who received $100,000 with half to charity, runners-up Carly & Leighton received $50,000 with half to charity.

Season 2

On 28 October 2015, the series was renewed for a second season, it aired on Monday, 21 March 2016. The season titled "Reno Rumble: East v West", pit state based rookie teams from The East and West Side of Australia competing against each other. The season has had unexpected low ratings and will likely not be renewed for a third season. The season was won by Lisa & John who received $100,000.

Season Ratings

Awards and nominations

Broadcasters

See also

 The Block (Australian TV series)
 House Rules (Australian TV series)

Notes

half of the prize money goes to charity

References

2015 Australian television series debuts
2016 Australian television series endings
2010s Australian reality television series
Nine Network original programming